The Throes is the debut album by indie rock duo Two Gallants released in 2004 (see 2004 in music).

The album was remastered and released as The Throes Remix on December 12, 2006, on vinyl. It also included a bonus track called "Anna's Sweater" a cover of song by a defunct San Francisco band Blear that was originally recorded for a compilation called ny2lon. The first press of 500 vinyl records where mistakenly printed with the track Mother's Blues.

Track listing
 "You Losin' Out" – 3:00
 "Two Days Short Tomorrow" – 4:57
 "Nothing to You" – 4:29
 "Crow Jane" – 8:02
 "Fail Hard to Regain" – 3:12
 "The Throes" – 8:03
 "Drive My Car" – 6:55
 "My Madonna" – 7:23
 "The Train That Stole My Man" – 7:49

Credits
Patrick Boissel – Mastering
Jeffrey Saltzman – Producer, Engineer
Dave Schultz – Mastering
Two Gallants – Arranger, Photography

References

Two Gallants (band) albums
2004 debut albums
Alive Naturalsound Records albums